Married is an American sitcom created by Andrew Gurland, which aired on FX from July 17, 2014, to October 1, 2015. The series stars Judy Greer, Nat Faxon, Jenny Slate, and Brett Gelman. On September 30, 2014, FX renewed Married for a 13 episode second season which premiered on July 16, 2015. On October 26, 2015, FX cancelled the series after two seasons and 23 episodes.

Premise 
The series follows Russ and Lina Bowman, a long-time married couple who, when they are not fighting over debts, child rearing and their declining sex life, are reminded that their close friendship is what drew them together in the first place. Contrasting the Bowmans' lifestyle are their two close friends: A.J., a wealthy but unstable divorcé, and Jess, a free spirit who struggles to settle down after marrying an older man.

Cast and characters

Main 
 Judy Greer as Lina Bowman
 Nat Faxon as Russ Bowman
 Jenny Slate as Jess (season 1, series regular; season 2, recurring)
 Brett Gelman as A.J.
 Sarah Burns as Abby (season 2)

Recurring 
 Raevan Lee Hanan as Ella Bowman
 Rachel Eggleston as Maya Bowman
 Skylar Gray as Frankie Bowman (seasons 1–2)
 Georgia May Geare as Frankie Bowman (season 2)
 John Hodgman as Bernie
 Paul Reiser as Shep
 Regina Hall as Roxanne
 Kimiko Glenn as Miranda (season 2)

Production and development 
On January 24, 2013, FX placed a pilot order under the working title of Untitled Andrew Gurland Project. The pilot was written and directed by Andrew Gurland. Gurland, Paul Young, and Peter Principato serve as executive producers, alongside FX Productions and Principato-Young Entertainment.

Casting announcements began in April 2013, with Nat Faxon cast in one of the lead roles as Russ Bowman, one half of the lead married couple. Judy Greer was the next actor cast in the role of Lina Bowman, the other half of the aforementioned couple, who is overwhelmed by her three young daughters and living in a new city with no friends. Jenny Slate and Brett Gelman were the last actors cast in the series, with Slate cast in the role of Jess, an ex-party girl who is now married to an older guy who struggles to keep up with her. Gelman signed on in the role of A.J., an intense, recently divorced guy who is pretending that he's over his ex.

On January 24, 2014, FX placed a series order under the title Married. Paul Reiser then joined the series in the recurring role of Shep, Jess's older husband. Shortly afterwards, Regina Hall was cast in the recurring role of Roxanne, A.J.'s ex-wife.

Series overview

Episodes

Season 1 (2014)

Season 2 (2015)

Reception 
On Rotten Tomatoes, the first season of Married has an aggregate score of 56% based on 20 positive and 16 negative critic reviews. The website's consensus reads: "In spite of superlative work from its talented stars, Married suffers from an unrelentingly grim portrayal of grown-up relationships."

References

External links 
 

2010s American romantic comedy television series
2010s American single-camera sitcoms
2014 American television series debuts
2015 American television series endings
English-language television shows
FX Networks original programming
Television shows set in Los Angeles